Mary Lou Piatek-Daniels (born August 6, 1961) is a retired tennis player from the U.S. who played on the WTA Tour during the 1980s.

In 1979, she was the no. 1 junior in the world. She won her first pro title at Richmond, Virginia 1981, beating Sylvia Hanika and Sue Barker en route. She was coached by her father Joseph, a former varsity player at Indiana University, and by Trinity coach Emilie Foster.

Piatek-Daniels made her ranking debut in February 1980 at no. 45. Her career wins include Robin White, Christiane Jolissaint, Kathy Horvath, Wendy White, Gigi Fernández, and Betsy Nagelsen.

WTA Tour finals

Singles 4 (2–2)

Doubles 21 (7–14)

References

External links
 
 

American female tennis players
People from Whiting, Indiana
Tennis people from Indiana
1961 births
Living people
Wimbledon junior champions
Grand Slam (tennis) champions in girls' singles
People from Munster, Indiana